The Civil Code of the Russian Federation (frequently abbreviated 'ГК РФ') is the prime source of civil law for the Russian Federation. The Russian Civil Law system descended from Roman Law through Byzantine tradition. It was heavily influenced by German and Dutch norms in the 18th-19th centuries. Socialist-style modifications took place during the Soviet period (1922-1991) and Continental European Law influences since the 1990s.

The Civil Code of the Russian Federation came into force in four parts. The first part, which deals with general provisions (i.e. defines sources, names legal entities etc.) was enacted by the State Duma in 1994 and entered into force in 1995. The second part (dealing with the Law of obligations) entered into force in 1996. The third part (Succession law) entered into force in 2002. The document has certain basic principles: equality of all participants guaranteed by civil law, inviolability of private property, freedom of contract, free exercise of civil rights and juridical protection of civil rights.

The fourth part, dealing with intellectual property, was signed into law on December 18, 2006 and came into force on January 1, 2008. Part IV became the first truly complete codification of the legislation on intellectual property in the world.

The structure of the Civil Code
 Part 1
 Section I: General provisions
 Section II: Ownership and other proprietary interests
 Section III: The general part of the law of obligations
 Part 2
 Section IV: Specific types of obligations
 Part 3
 Section V: Succession law
 Section VI: International private law
 Part 4
 Section VII: The right to products of intellectual activity and means of individualization

Unlike most European civil codes, Russia's Civil Code does not cover family law. Instead, family law is dealt with in a separate code.

History
Since its foundation as an independent successor state of the former Soviet Union, the Russian Federation had been engaged in a large legislative project of developing a new Civil Code. In July 1994, President Boris Yeltsin signed a decree authorizing the "Establishment and Development of Private Law in Russia" program. The program called for a group of legal researchers, led by Sergei Alexeyev, to create a new civil code for the nation. Initially, Russian politicians on all sides of the political spectrum opposed the idea of a Civil Code. It took significant effort to get first part of the Code approved by the State Duma — while the Federation Council voted against the Code. However, the Federation Council took longer than allowed by the Constitution to come to its decision. This allowed Yeltsin to sign the Code into law. In other words, as Sergei Alexeyev put it, the Civil Code became law almost "by accident".

See also
 Law of the Russian Federation
 Criminal Code of Russia
 Offences Code of Russia
 Family Code of Russia
 Customs Code of Russia

References

External links
Full text English translation of parts 1 to 3 of the Civil Code of the Russian Federation. Old edition on December 23, 2003, after this date many changes were made.
Full text English translation of part 4 of the Civil Code of the Russian Federation made by Rospatent in 2011.
Russian Federation, Federal law no. 231- of 2006: . Law 231-FL of December 18, 2006: implementation act for part IV of the Civil Code. In Russian. URL last accessed 2010-07-13.

Law of Russia
Russia